The Third Republic was the planned republican government of Nigeria in 1993 which was to be governed by the Third Republican constitution.

Founded (1993) 

The constitution of the Third Republic was drafted in 1989. General Ibrahim Badamasi Babangida (IBB), the military head of state, promised to end military rule by 1990. This date was subsequently pushed back to 1993. In the spring of 1989, IBB lifted the ban on political activity, which had been in place since the coup of 1983. The conference established two political parties: the center-right National Republican Convention (NRC) and the center-left Social Democratic Party (SDP). The parties were required to draw from a national rather than regional or tribal basis. Gubernatorial and state legislative elections were conducted in December 1991. The civilian governors elected in this balloting took office in January 1992.

The presidential election was postponed until 12 June 1993 due to political unrest. MKO Abiola, a wealthy Yoruba businessman, won a decisive victory in the presidential elections on the SDP platform, defeating  Bashir Tofa of the National Republican Convention. Abiola won even in his northern opponent's home state. Abiola won in the Federal capital, Abuja, the military polling stations, and in over two-thirds of Nigerian states. Men of northern descent largely dominated Nigeria's political landscape after independence and the win by Abiola, a southern Muslim, remains unequaled today. 

IBB said years later that he now regards the decision to annul the election as unfortunate given its consequences. But he still believes he did the right thing, he said, because he had specific information about plans to overthrow the Abiola government and it seemed pointless to turn the country over to civilian rule if there would be a military coup within months. He acknowledged the irony of the Sani Abacha coup in the light of this claim but maintained that the military overthrow of the civilian government that succeeded him was precisely the outcome he had been trying to avoid.

Presidents-elect

Political parties
National Republican Convention (NRC)
Social Democratic Party (SDP)

Annulment
On 23 June 1993, IBB had the election annulled. This threw the country into chaos. "Many Yoruba have long resented the domination of Nigeria's political life by the mostly northern Hausa-Fulani ethnic group, and were ecstatic when one of their own, Mr. Abiola, appeared to have won the recent balloting", commented the New York Times. The United Kingdom responded to the announcement by freezing aid and withdrawing military assistance. IBB eventually bowed to pressure from his inner circle and resigned from office on 23 August 1993. Ernest Shonekan, a Yoruba businessman and the head of IBB's transition team, assumed the office of the presidency as the head of the interim national government. Shonekan was unable to manage the political turmoil which ensued in the post IBB months.

Shonekan's caretaker government was quietly removed from office by Minister of Defence, General Sani Abacha on 17 November 1993. On 11 June 1994, president-elect Moshood Kashimawo Olawale Abiola declared himself president and went into hiding. The Abacha administration hunted Abiola down and arrested him on charges of treason. Abiola remained in prison until he died in 1998.

See also
 Nigerian First Republic (1963–1966)
 Nigerian Second Republic (1979–1983)
 Nigerian Fourth Republic (1999–present)

References

Further reading
 Nigeria – US State Department Profile
 The History of Nigeria
 Media Accountability and Democracy in Nigeria

History of Nigeria
1993 in Nigeria
Republic of Nigeria 03
Politics of Nigeria
1990s in Nigeria